Poems in Prose may refer to:

 Poems in Prose (Turgenev), the cycle of 83 prose Poems by Ivan Turgenev written in 1877—1882
 Poems in Prose (Wilde), the collective title of six prose poems published by Oscar Wilde in 1894
 Poems in Prose (Smith), an illustrated collection of prose poems by Clark Ashton Smith from 1965